Adamantane is an organic compound with a formula C10H16 or, more descriptively, (CH)4(CH2)6. Adamantane molecules can be described as the fusion of three cyclohexane rings. The molecule is both rigid and virtually stress-free. Adamantane is the most stable isomer of C10H16. The spatial arrangement of carbon atoms in the adamantane molecule is the same as in the diamond crystal. This similarity led to the name adamantane, which is derived from the Greek adamantinos (relating to steel or diamond). It is a white solid with a camphor-like odor. It is the simplest diamondoid.

The discovery of adamantane in petroleum in 1933 launched a new field of chemistry dedicated to the synthesis and properties of polyhedral organic compounds. Adamantane derivatives have found practical application as drugs, polymeric materials, and thermally stable lubricants.

History and synthesis
In 1924, H. Decker suggested the existence of adamantane, which he called decaterpene.

The first attempted laboratory synthesis was made in 1924 by German chemist Hans Meerwein using the reaction of formaldehyde with diethyl malonate in the presence of piperidine. Instead of adamantane, Meerwein obtained 1,3,5,7-tetracarbomethoxybicyclo[3.3.1]nonane-2,6-dione: this compound, later named Meerwein's ester, was used in the synthesis of adamantane and its derivatives. D. Bottger tried to obtain adamantane using Meerwein's ester as precursor. The product, tricyclo-[3.3.1.13,7], was not adamantane, but a derivative.

Other researchers attempted to synthesize adamantane using phloroglucinol and derivatives of cyclohexanone, but also failed.

Adamantane was first synthesized by Vladimir Prelog in 1941 from Meerwein's ester. With a yield of 0.16%, the five-stage process was impractical (simplified in the image below). The method is used to synthesize certain derivatives of adamantane.

Prelog's method was refined in 1956. The decarboxylation yield was increased by the addition of the Heinsdecker pathway (11%) and the Hoffman reaction (24%) that raised the total yield to 6.5%. The process was still too complex, and a more convenient method was found in 1957 by Paul von Ragué Schleyer: dicyclopentadiene was first hydrogenated in the presence of a catalyst (e.g. platinum dioxide) and then transformed into adamantane using a Lewis acid (e.g. aluminium chloride) as another catalyst. This method increased the yield to 30–40% and provided an affordable source of adamantane; it therefore stimulated characterization of adamantane and is still used in laboratory practice. The adamantane synthesis yield was later increased to 60% and 98% by ultrasound and super acid catalysts. Today, adamantane is an affordable chemical compound with a cost of about $1 a gram.

All the above methods yield adamantane as a polycrystalline powder. Using this powder, single crystals can be grown from the melt, solution, or vapor phase (e.g. with the Bridgman–Stockbarger technique). Melt growth results in the worst crystalline quality with a mosaic spread in the X-ray reflection of about 1°. The best crystals are obtained from the liquid phase, but the growth is impracticably slow – several months for a 5–10 mm crystal. Growth from the vapor phase is a reasonable compromise in terms of speed and quality. Adamantane is sublimed in a quartz tube placed in a furnace, which is equipped with several heaters maintaining a certain temperature gradient (about 10 °C/cm for adamantane) along the tube. Crystallization starts at one end of the tube, which is kept near the freezing point of adamantane.  Slow cooling of the tube, while maintaining the temperature gradient, gradually shifts the melting zone (rate ~2 mm/hour) producing a single-crystal boule.

Natural occurrence
Adamantane was first isolated from petroleum by the Czech chemists S. Landa, V. Machacek, and M. Mzourek.
They used fractional distillation of petroleum based. Landa et al. could produce only a few milligrams of adamantane, but noticed its high boiling and melting points. Because of the (assumed) similarity of its structure to that of diamond, the new compound was named adamantane.

Petroleum remains a source of adamantane; the content varies from between 0.0001% and 0.03% depending on the oil field and is too low for commercial production.

Petroleum contains more than thirty derivatives of adamantane. Their isolation from a complex mixture of hydrocarbons is possible due to their high melting point and the ability to distill with water vapor and form stable adducts with thiourea.

Physical properties
Pure adamantane is a colorless, crystalline solid with a characteristic camphor smell. It is practically insoluble in water, but readily soluble in nonpolar organic solvents. Adamantane has an unusually high melting point for a hydrocarbon.   At 270 °C, its melting point is much higher than other hydrocarbons with the same molecular weight, such as camphene (45 °C), limonene (−74 °C), ocimene (50 °C), terpinene (60 °C) or twistane (164 °C), or than a linear C10H22 hydrocarbon decane (−28 °C). However, adamantane slowly sublimes even at room temperature. Adamantane can be distilled with water vapor.

Structure

As deduced by electron diffraction and X-ray crystallography, the molecule has Td symmetry. The carbon–carbon bond lengths are 1.54 Å, almost identical to that of diamond. The carbon–hydrogen distances are 1.112 Å.

At ambient conditions, adamantane crystallizes in a face-centered cubic structure (space group Fm3m, a = 9.426 ± 0.008 Å, four molecules in the unit cell) containing orientationally disordered adamantane molecules. This structure transforms into an ordered, primitive, tetragonal phase (a = 6.641 Å, c = 8.875 Å) with two molecules per cell, either upon cooling to 208 K or pressurizing to above 0.5 GPa.

This phase transition is of the first order; it is accompanied by an anomaly in the heat capacity, elastic, and other properties. In particular, whereas adamantane molecules freely rotate in the cubic phase, they are frozen in the tetragonal one; the density increases stepwise from 1.08 to 1.18 g/cm3 and the entropy changes by a significant amount of 1594 J/(mol·K).

Hardness
Elastic constants of adamantane were measured using large (centimeter-sized) single crystals and the ultrasonic echo technique. The principal value of the elasticity tensor, C11, was deduced as 7.52, 8.20, and 6.17 GPa for the <110>, <111>, and <100> crystalline directions. For comparison, the corresponding values for crystalline diamond are 1161, 1174, and 1123 GPa. The arrangement of carbon atoms is the same in adamantane and diamond. However, in the adamantane solid, molecules do not form a covalent lattice as in diamond, but interact through weak Van der Waals forces. As a result, adamantane crystals are very soft and plastic.

Spectroscopy
The nuclear magnetic resonance (NMR) spectrum of adamantane consists of two poorly resolved signals, which correspond to sites 1 and 2 (see picture below). The 1H and 13C NMR chemical shifts are respectively 1.873 and 1.756 ppm and are 28.46 and 37.85 ppm. The simplicity of these spectra is consistent with high molecular symmetry.

Mass spectra of adamantane and its derivatives are rather characteristic. The main peak at m/z = 136 corresponds to the  ion. Its fragmentation results in weaker signals as m/z = 93, 80, 79, 67, 41 and 39.

The infrared absorption spectrum of adamantane is relatively simple because of the high symmetry of the molecule. The main absorption bands and their assignment are given in the table:

* Legends correspond to types of oscillations: δ – deformation, ν – stretching, ρ and ω – out of plane deformation vibrations of CH2 groups.

Optical activity
Adamantane derivatives with different substituents at every nodal carbon sites are chiral. Such optical activity was described in adamantane in 1969 with the four different substituents being hydrogen, bromine and methyl and carboxyl group. The values of specific rotation are small and are usually within 1°.

Nomenclature
Using the rules of systematic nomenclature, adamantane is called tricyclo[3.3.1.13,7]decane. However, IUPAC recommends using the name "adamantane".

The adamantane molecule is composed of only carbon and hydrogen and has Td symmetry. Therefore, its 16 hydrogen and 10 carbon atoms can be described by only two sites, which are labeled in the figure as 1 (4 equivalent sites) and 2 (6 equivalent sites).

Structural relatives of adamantane are noradamantane and homoadamantane, which respectively contain one less and one more CH2 link than the adamantane.

Chemical properties

Adamantane cations
The adamantane cation can be produced by treating 1-fluoro-adamantane with SbF5. Its stability is relatively high.

The dication of 1,3-didehydroadamantane was obtained in solutions of superacids. It also has elevated stability due to the phenomenon called "three-dimensional aromaticity" or homoaromaticity. This four-center two-electron bond involves one pair of electrons delocalized among the four bridgehead atoms.

Reactions
Most reactions of adamantane occur via the 3-coordinated carbon sites. They are involved in the reaction of adamantane with concentrated sulfuric acid which produces adamantanone.

The carbonyl group of adamantanone allows further reactions via the bridging site. For example, adamantanone is the starting compound for obtaining such derivatives of adamantane as 2-adamantanecarbonitrile and 2-methyl-adamantane.

Bromination
Adamantane readily reacts with various brominating agents, including molecular bromine. The composition and the ratio of the reaction products depend on the reaction conditions and especially the presence and type of catalysts.

Boiling of adamantane with bromine results in a monosubstituted adamantane, 1-bromadamantane. Multiple substitution with bromine is achieved by adding a Lewis acid catalyst.

The rate of bromination is accelerated upon addition of Lewis acids and is unchanged by irradiation or addition of free radicals. This indicates that the reaction occurs via an ionic mechanism.

Fluorination
The first fluorinations of adamantane were conducted using 1-hydroxyadamantane and 1-aminoadamantane as initial compounds. Later, fluorination was achieved starting from adamantane itself. In all these cases, reaction proceeded via formation of adamantane cation which then interacted with fluorinated nucleophiles. Fluorination of adamantane with gaseous fluorine has also been reported.

Carboxylation
Carboxylation of adamantane with formic acid gives 1-adamantanecarboxylic acid.

Oxidation
1-Hydroxyadamantane is readily formed by hydrolysis of 1-bromadamantane in aqueous solution of acetone. It can also be produced by ozonation of the adamantane:  Oxidation of the alcohol gives adamantanone.

Others
Adamantane interacts with benzene in the presence of Lewis acids, resulting in a Friedel–Crafts reaction. Aryl-substituted adamantane derivatives can be easily obtained starting from 1-hydroxyadamantane. In particular, the reaction with anisole proceeds under normal conditions and does not require a catalyst.

Nitration of adamantane is a difficult reaction characterized by moderate yields. A nitrogen-substituted drug amantadine can be prepared by reacting adamantane with bromine or nitric acid to give the bromide or nitroester at the 1-position. Reaction of either compound with acetonitrile affords the acetamide, which is hydrolyzed  to give 1-adamantylamine:

Uses
Adamantane itself enjoys few applications since it is merely an unfunctionalized hydrocarbon. It is used in some dry etching masks and polymer formulations.

In solid-state NMR spectroscopy, adamantane is a common standard for chemical shift referencing.

In dye lasers, adamantane may be used to extend the life of the gain medium; it cannot be photoionized under atmosphere because its absorption bands lie in the vacuum-ultraviolet region of the spectrum. Photoionization energies have been determined for adamantane as well as for several bigger diamondoids.

In medicine
All medical applications known so far involve not pure adamantane, but its derivatives. The first adamantane derivative used as a drug was amantadine – first (1967) as an antiviral drug against various strains of influenza and then to treat Parkinson's disease. Other drugs among adamantane derivatives include adapalene, adapromine, bromantane, carmantadine, chlodantane, dopamantine, memantine, rimantadine, saxagliptin, tromantadine, and vildagliptin. Polymers of adamantane have been patented as antiviral agents against HIV.

Influenza virus strains have developed drug resistance to amantadine and rimantadine, which are not effective against prevalent strains as of 2016.

In designer drugs
Adamantane was recently identified as a key structural subunit in several synthetic cannabinoid designer drugs, namely AB-001 and SDB-001.

Spacecraft propellant 
 
Adamantane is an attractive candidate for propellant in Hall-effect thrusters because it ionizes easily, can be stored in solid form rather than a heavy pressure tank, and is relatively nontoxic.

Potential technological applications
Some alkyl derivatives of adamantane have been used as a working fluid in hydraulic systems. Adamantane-based polymers might find application for coatings of touchscreens, and there are prospects for using adamantane and its homologues in nanotechnology. For example, the soft cage-like structure of adamantane solid allow incorporation of guest molecules, which can be released inside the human body upon breaking the matrix.
Adamantane could be used as molecular building blocks for self-assembly of molecular crystals.

Adamantane analogues
Many molecules and ions adopt adamantane-like cage structures. Those include phosphorus trioxide P4O6, arsenic trioxide As4O6, phosphorus pentoxide P4O10 = (PO)4O6, phosphorus pentasulfide P4S10 = (PS)4S6, and hexamethylenetetramine C6N4H12 = N4(CH2)6. Particularly notorious is tetramethylenedisulfotetramine, often shortened to "tetramine", a rodenticide banned in most countries for extreme toxicity to humans. The silicon analogue of adamantane, sila-adamantane, was synthesized in 2005.
Arsenicin A is a naturally occurring organoarsenic chemical isolated from the New Caledonian sea sponge Echinochalina bargibanti and is the first known polyarsenic heterocycle.

Conjoining adamantane cages produces higher diamondoids, such as diamantane (C14H20 – two fused adamantane cages), triamantane (C18H24), tetramantane (C22H28), pentamantane (C26H32), hexamantane (C26H30), etc. Their synthesis is similar to that of adamantane and like adamantane, they can also be extracted from petroleum, though at even much smaller yields.

References